Schlumbergera truncata, the false Christmas cactus, is a species of plant in the family Cactaceae. It is endemic to a small area of the coastal mountains of south-eastern Brazil where its natural habitats are subtropical or tropical moist forests. It is the parent or one of the parents of the houseplants called Christmas cactus, Thanksgiving cactus or zygocactus, among other names.

Description

Schlumbergera truncata resembles other species of the genus Schlumbergera in that it has leafless green stems which act as photosynthetic organs. The stems  (cladodes) are composed of strongly flattened segments, which have two or three "teeth" of varying shapes along their edges and at the ends. The ends of the stems are "cut off" (truncated) rather than pointed.

Special structures characteristic of cacti, called "areoles", occur between two teeth at the end of segments. The flowers are held at a constant angle somewhat above the horizontal with the higher side different from the lower side (zygomorphic, specifically bilaterally symmetrical). There are six to eight tepals, which may be of various colours, including shades of red, orange, pink and white. The outer tepals (those at the base of the flower) are shorter and bent backwards, the inner tepals are longer and fused together at the base to form a floral tube; nectar is produced at the base of this tube. The lower inner petals are bent backwards so that the upper inner petals appear longer. Plants flower in the autumn: around May in their natural habitat, in October to November in cultivation in the Northern Hemisphere; short days and long nights are necessary to induce flowering.

A characteristic of the genus Schlumbergera is that the many stamens are arranged in two series: the inner stamens form a ring around the style; the outer stamens arise from the floral tube. The filaments of the stamens are white, the anthers and pollen being yellow. The style has six to eight lobes at its end and is dark red.

Taxonomy
The epithet truncata means "abruptly cut off", and refers to the shape of the ends of the stems.

The species was first properly named for science by Haworth in 1819 as Epiphyllum truncatum. His name was based on living specimens growing at the Royal Botanic Gardens, Kew in 1818. (However these do not appear to have been preserved, so an illustration published by W.J. Hooker in 1822 was designated as the "neotype" by N.P. Taylor.) Like others in the genus, the species was transferred to Zygocactus by Schumann in 1890, and then to Schlumbergera by Moran in 1953. Some other names in the genus Epiphyllum are now considered to be synonyms of S. truncata.

Synonyms include:

Cactus truncatus Hooker, nomen nudum
Epiphyllum truncatum Haw.
Cactus truncatus (Haw.) Link
Cereus truncatus (Haw.) Sweet
Zygocactus truncatus (Haw.) K.Schum.
Epiphyllum altensteinii Pfeif.
Zygocactus altensteinii (Pfeif.) K.Schum.
Epiphyllum delicatum N.E.Br.
Zygocactus delicatum (N.E.Br.) Britton & Rose
Epiphyllum ruckeri Paxton

Epiphyllum bridgesii Lem., Schlumbergera bridgesii (Lem.) Loefgr. and Epiphyllum ruckerianum sensu Lem. have sometimes been treated as synonyms of S. truncata, but are regarded by David Hunt as synonyms of the hybrid S. × buckleyi.

Distribution and habitat

Schlumbergera truncata occurs only in a small area of the coastal mountains of south-east Brazil, in the state of Rio de Janeiro, located in the southernmost part of the tropics. Sites where it has been found include the Organ Mountains (Serra dos Órgãos) in the Parque Nacional da Serra dos Órgãos and in the Serra do Mar near to the city of Rio de Janeiro. Because of their altitude and proximity to the Atlantic Ocean, the coastal mountains have high humidity – warm moist air is forced upwards into higher, colder locations where it condenses. S. truncata usually grows on trees (epiphytic), or on rocks (epilythic). The native status of S. truncata has become confused because European cultivars were deliberately introduced into some areas, including the Parque Nacional da Serra dos Órgãos, by the Brazilian Agricultural Department, to compensate for over-collecting of wild plants.

Cultivation

Schlumbergera truncata is mainly grown as cultivars of the species or of its hybrids with other species of the genus, particularly S. russelliana. These plants and their cultivation are discussed at Schlumbergera: Cultivation.

References

truncata
Endemic flora of Brazil
Flora of the Atlantic Forest
Cacti of South America
Taxa named by Reid Venable Moran
Garden plants of South America